Thalassotalea ponticola  is a  Gram-negative and aerobic bacterium from the genus of Thalassotalea which has been isolated from seawater from the Geoje Island in Korea.

References

External links
Type strain of Thalassotalea ponticola at BacDive -  the Bacterial Diversity Metadatabase

 

Alteromonadales
Bacteria described in 2014